P. Subbiah Ambalam was an Indian politician and member of parliament who was elected to the 2nd Lok Sabha, representing Ramanathapuram parliamentary constituency from 1957 to 62. He was affiliated with the Indian National Congress.

Biography 
He was born to Perianan Ambalam on 4 May 1921 in Ramanathapuram district, Tamil Nadu. He received his education from Madras Christian College, Tambaram and Madras Law College, Madras (in modern-day Dr. Ambedkar Government Law College, Chennai).

He was married to Pappathy Ammal, with whom he had five children, including one daughter and four sons.

References 

1921 births
Place of death unknown
Year of death unknown
Madras Christian College alumni
India MPs 1957–1962
People from Ramanathapuram district
Indian National Congress politicians from Tamil Nadu